Charles Britton (23 August 1865 – 9 September 1906) was a South African cricketer. He played in three first-class matches for Eastern Province in 1889/90 and 1890/91.

See also
 List of Eastern Province representative cricketers

References

External links
 

1865 births
1906 deaths
South African cricketers
Eastern Province cricketers
Place of birth missing